Ingolf is a masculine given name, that has its roots in Germanic mythology. The first part "Ing" refers to the germanic god Yngvi, the second part means "wolf". It may refer to:

Count Ingolf of Rosenborg (born 1940), member of the Danish royal family
Ingolf Elster Christensen (1872–1943), Norwegian politician
Ingolf Dahl (1912–1970), German-born American composer, pianist, conductor and educator
Ingolf U. Dalferth (born 1948), German philosopher and theologian
Ingolf Davidsen (1893–1946), Norwegian gymnast
Ingolf Gabold (born 1942), Danish composer
Ingolf Lindau (born 1942), Swedish physicist and professor
Ingolf Lück (born 1958), German actor, comedian and television host
Ingolf Mork (born 1947), Norwegian ski jumper
Ingolf E. Rasmus (1902-1996), American politician and lawyer
Ingolf Rød (1889–1963), Norwegian sailor
Ingolf Rogde (1911–1978), Norwegian actor
Ingolf Schanche (1877–1954), Norwegian actor and theatre director
Ingolf Håkon Teigene (1949–2007), Norwegian journalist
Ingolf Wiegert (born 1957), former East German handball player
Ingolf Wunder (born 1985), Austrian pianist
Ingolf Vogeler, a character in the Emberverse series of science fiction novels by S. M. Stirling, first appearing in The Sunrise Lands

Norwegian masculine given names